Forest Park High School is a public high school in Woodbridge, Virginia, unincorporated Prince William County, Virginia, United States. It is part of Prince William County Public Schools and is located on 15721 Forest Park Drive (formerly Spriggs Road; the name changed during 2005-2006 construction on Spriggs Road). The school's name references adjacent Prince William Forest Park, one of the largest natural parks in the Washington metropolitan area.

Forest Park, which was opened in 2000, is the home of the first information technology (iT) specialty program in Prince William County.

In 2008 Newsweek magazine ranked Forest Park on its annual list of "America's Top Public High Schools"

Academics

iT program 
Forest Park High School is a center for the iT (Information Technology) program. All interested students must apply for the program, bringing in many students around Prince William County. There are three fields that students can enter: Computer Graphics, Networking, Programming. Each year, iT students are required to take an iT core class. Students can receive a special iT Diploma if they complete six iT courses (four core), or five iT courses and an AP class.

Demographics 
In the 2017-2018 school year, Forest Park's student body was:
27.1% Black/African American
20.8% Hispanic 
8.2% Asian
7.6% Two or More Races
.2% American Indian/Alaskan
.1% Hawaiian/Pacific Islander
36.0% White

Test scores 
Forest Park High School is an accredited high school based on its performance on the Virginia Standards of Learning tests.

Athletics 
The Forest Park High School mascot and athletic emblem is the Bruin with royal blue and Kelly green serving as its school colors.  The school is a member of the AAA Cardinal District of the AAA Northwest Region of the Virginia High School League (VHSL).

The Bruins compete in the following sports:

 Fall sports 
 Cheerleading 
 Cross country (boys and girls)
 Field hockey
 Football
 Golf 
 Volleyball
 Winter sports
 Basketball (boys and girls)
 Indoor track (boys and girls)
 Swimming (boys and girls)
 Wrestling

 Spring sports
 Baseball
 Softball
 Crew (boys and girls)
 Lacrosse (boys and girls)
 Soccer (boys and girls)
 Tennis (boys and girls)
 Track and field (boys and girls)

Athletic and activities championships

State champions
 2003 Girls Volleyball 
 2004, 2006 Girls Basketball 
 2013 Boys Indoor Track 
 2013 Boys Outdoor Track 
 2014 Boys Indoor Track 
 2020 CyberPatriot Virginia All Service Division 
 2021 CyberPatriot Virginia All Service Division 
 2021 CyberPatriot All Service Division National Finalists

Notable athletic alumni 
 Ali Krieger – Soccer player; NJ/NY Gotham FC, United States women's national soccer team world cup champion
 C. J. Sapong – Soccer player; James Madison University, Philadelphia Union
 Monica Wright – Basketball player; University of Virginia, WNBA Minnesota Lynx
 Mustaqeem Williams – Track/Football player; University of Tennessee, XFL Vegas Vipers 2020 Olympic Trials
 Ricky Morgan – Track; University of Southern California, Gold Medalist World Junior Championship Team USA Coach University of Texas
 Josh Washington – Track; University of Arkansas, 4xAll American

Extracurricular activities
Forest Park students have the opportunity to participate in a wide variety of special interest clubs that offer activities, events and competitions, including:

Academic Team
America's Club
Art Club
Breakfast With Santa
Chess Club
Computer Science Team
Cyber Club
Dance Team
Debate Team
Drama Club
Earth Science Resource Club
Edge Club
Educators Rising
FBLA
Fellowship of Christian Athletes
French Club
French Honor Society
German club
International Club
JROTC
Key Club
Math League
Sr. Macina's Fan Club
Model UN
Muslim Student Association

My Little Pony Club
National Art Honor Society
National Honor Society
Orchestra Club
Photography Club
Racquetball Team
Relay for Life Club
Robotics
Russian club
SCA
Science National Honor Society
Social Studies Honor Society
Spanish Club
Spanish Honor Society
Spring Musical
Student Ambassador Program
Theater Sports
Ursa Major Literary Magazine

Band
Under the direction of Mr. Shawn W. Davern, the Forest Park band program, a fourteen-time Virginia honor band, offers a wide variety of performing groups, both curricular and extracurricular including

Concert Band
Symphonic Band
Wind Ensemble
The Marching Bruin Band
Pep Band
Jazz Band
Indoor Ensembles
Chamber Ensembles

Marching Band—performs at the football games as well as competitions. They also perform in the commons certain mornings before class starts.

Pep Band—organized in the 2001–02 school year by students, the Pep Band performs at both the boys and girls basketball home games as well as any regional/state games they are allowed to attend.

Chorus 
Forest Park's choir program has received regional, state and national recognition. In 2005, the Concert Choir was awarded Overall Grand Champion at a national music festival in Orlando. In 2006 and 2008, the Concert Choir was awarded Overall Choral Champion at an international festival in New York City. In 2009, Forest Park Choirs won the Sweepstakes Award at Heritage Festivals in Atlanta. In December 2009, the choir was featured at Epcot Center at the Candlelight Celebration Concert with celebrity narrator, Whoopi Goldberg. In 2011, the Bel Canto Women’s Choir was awarded the Adjudicator’s Award at a national choral festival in New York City, while the Concert Choir and Platinum Jazz won 1st place in their categories. In 2015, Forest Park's Concert Choir was featured at Epcot Center at the Christmas Candlelight Processional with Celebrity Narrator, Chandra Wilson.

The program is directed by Ms. Lara Brittain. Ensembles in the vocal music program include:
 Platinum Vocal Jazz Ensemble
 Concert Choir
 VoiceMale
 Bel Canto
 Men's Chorus
 Varsity Women's Choir

Orchestra
 Intermediate orchestra
 Advanced orchestra
 Consort orchestra

Drama
Forest Park High School also hosts a drama club. Sponsoring three shows a year (a musical, mainstage play, and a one-act play), the program is currently headed by Mrs. Lori Spitzer-Wilk. Forest Park has performed popular shows in the past such as Beauty and the Beast, Sweet Charity, The Wizard of Oz, Oklahoma! , Shrek The Musical, and Young Frankenstein.

Ursa Major literary magazine
The Forest Park literary magazine, Ursa Major'', is a publication produced by the students of the Creative Writing classes and is sponsored by Mrs. Laura Dowling. The magazine is open to all students in the school for literary and artistic submissions. Publication of the magazine is annual in the spring. The magazine also sponsors a Coffee House in the early spring to showcase art in all forms. The magazine can be purchased each June or on-line at lulu.com.

See also

 Prince William County Public Schools
 Virginia High School League

References

External links 
 
 GreatSchools Profile

Educational institutions established in 2000
Public high schools in Virginia
Northern Virginia Scholastic Hockey League teams
Schools in Prince William County, Virginia
2000 establishments in Virginia